Gideon Njoku (died 10 January 2011) was a Nigerian professional football player and coach.

Playing career
Njoku played for Nigeria at international level, winning a gold medal at the 1973 All-Africa Games.

Coaching career
After retiring as a player, Njoku coached ACB Lagos and Enyimba.

References

1940s births
2011 deaths
Nigerian footballers
Nigeria international footballers
Nigerian football managers
African Games gold medalists for Nigeria
African Games medalists in football
Association footballers not categorized by position
Footballers at the 1973 All-Africa Games